The 2008–09 season was the third consecutive season in the second division of German football, the 2. Bundesliga, played by TuS Koblenz, a professional football club based in Koblenz, Rhineland-Palatinate, Germany. The club finished 14th in the 2. Bundesliga despite a three-point deduction, and in addition to the 2. Bundesliga, Tus Koblenz also participated in the DFB-Pokal, where they were eliminated in the first round by FC Oberneuland. The club played their homes matches at Stadion Oberwerth. The season covers the period from 1 July 2008 to 30 June 2009.

Players

First-team squad
Players' ages as of 17 August 2008.

Left club during season

Notes

Competitions

2. Bundesliga

League table

DFB-Pokal

References

TuS Koblenz seasons
German football clubs 2008–09 season